Dissocarpus biflorus, commonly known as twin flower saltbush, grows along the coast line and estuaries of Australia. 
The flowers grow as hairy clumps in the axils present between May and July.

External links
Online Field guide to Common Saltmarsh Plants of Queensland

Amaranthaceae
Taxa named by Robert Brown (botanist, born 1773)